Rebeka Dremelj (born 25 July 1980) is a Slovene singer, model, fashion designer, actress, and TV host. She was chosen to represent Slovenia at the Eurovision Song Contest 2008 in Belgrade, Serbia, with the song "Vrag naj vzame".

Professional and personal life
Rebeka Dremelj was born in Brežice, SR Slovenia, Yugoslavia. She became a singer and was selected as Miss Slovenia 2001. Dremelj participated in Miss World 2001 and at the Miss World Talent Show in 2001 she landed the second place and thus signed a contract with Sony Records London. Dremelj represented Slovenia in the Eurovision Song Contest 2008 where she did not make it through the final. Since 2011 Rebeka has been married to Sandi Škaler, and they have two children. Their first daughter is Šajana (born on 17 September 2012); another daughter was born on 3 December 2016 with name Sija.

Discography

Popular Singles

 Ko ugasnejo luči
 Prvi korak
 Nisem kriva
 Ne ustavi se
 Ne boš se igral
 Pojdi z menoj
 To je prava noč
 Daj mi daj
 Slovenski superboy
 Vrag naj vzame
 Petek 13.
 Sončno dekle
 Ribica
 Brez obraza

Albums
 Prvi korak – 2002
 To sem jaz – 2004
 Pojdi z menoj – 2006
 Nepremagljiva – 2009
 Differo – 2010

References

External links
	 
 Rebeka's homepage 

1980 births
Living people
People from Brežice
Eurovision Song Contest entrants of 2008
Miss World 2001 delegates
Eurovision Song Contest entrants for Slovenia
Slovenian female models
21st-century Slovenian women singers
Slovenian beauty pageant winners
Hayat Production artists